Lillian Harris Dean (1870 – 1929) was an African-American cook and entrepreneur who became a minor national celebrity in the 1920s for bringing the cuisine of Harlem, New York City, to national attention.

Early life and career
Dean was born in the Mississippi Delta in 1870.  She migrated to New York and became a highly successful entrepreneur who catered to the culinary tastes of other displaced African-American Southerners living in Harlem.  She took the name Pig Foot Mary because she turned marketing traditional foods such as pigs' feet, hog maws, chitterlings (chitlins), and other foods into a thriving business.  Though she did not attain the fame or millionaire status of Madam C. J. Walker, Dean was an early example of African-American entrepreneurial success in the post-Civil War era.

Dean began by selling food in 1901 on 60th Street sidewalk out of a makeshift cart — actually, a re-purposed baby carriage — at the corner of West 135th Street (what is now Malcolm X Boulevard). Her wares included chitterlings, hogmaws, and pig's feet as well as corn. In time, she was able to afford a steam table booth, which she attached to the corner newsstand — and she married the newsstand owner, John Dean. Her biography is summed up in these two paragraphs by prominent African-American journalist Roi Ottley, writing in 1943:

She is described by James Weldon Johnson in his 1925 magazine article "The Making of Harlem":

In 1908 she married John Dean, a postal worker and newsstand owner.

Johnson provided a slightly different version in 1930's "Black Manhattan":

Later life
As Johnson notes, Dean invested her food stand profits in real estate and attained a considerable fortune, "several hundred thousand dollars" according to landmark information from the City of New York's Department of Planning.  Ottley provides further detail, stating that John Dean encouraged his wife to invest:

Ottley was enumerating these sums in 1917 dollars (the building purchase), 1923 dollars (the sale), and 1943 dollars (her eventual fortune).  Adjusted for inflation, these sums record a remarkable history of accomplishment for a woman who arrived in New York City at the turn of the 20th century, alone, illiterate and completely impoverished.

Lillian Harris Dean retired to California and died in 1929.

Loretta Devine portrays a highly fictionalized version of Dean in the 1997 movie Hoodlum; she is a gangster's girlfriend who is murdered by her lover's enemies. Her story was memorialized in a Daniel Carlton play Pigfoot Mary Says Goodbye to the Harlem Renaissance.

See also

 Harlem
 Soul food

References

Further reading
 Dolkart, Andrew S., and Gretchen Sullivan Sorin (1997). Touring Historic Harlem: Four Walks in Northern Manhattan. New York: New York Landmarks Conservancy (City and Company). .
 Wintz, Cary D., and Paul Finkelman, eds (2004), Encyclopedia of the Harlem Renaissance (two vols). .
 Harris, Trudier (1997).  "The Yellow Rose of Texas: A Different Cultural View." Callaloo 20.1 pp. 8–19, at p. 12.

1870 births
1929 deaths
American food industry businesspeople
People from Mississippi
People from Harlem
American women in business